Koppam  is a growing town and gram panchayat in Pattambi taluk Palakkad district in the state of Kerala, India.

Demographics
As of 2011 Census, Koppam had a population of 30,169 with 14,498 males and 15,671 females. Koppam village had an average literacy of 92.95% higher than the national average of 74.04% and lower than state average of 94.00%.

References

Villages in Palakkad district
Gram panchayats in Palakkad district